Medi may refer to:

Medi, India, a village
33376 Medi, an asteroid
Maedi or Medi, an ancient Thracian or Illyrian tribe
Médi 1, a commercial Moroccan radio network

See also
Médis, a French commune